The Shoalhaven Mariners Baseball Association, also known as the Shoalhaven Mariners is a baseball club based in the northern Shoalhaven and is one of the youngest clubs in Australian baseball.  They are the youngest club participating in the Illawarra Baseball League.

In previous seasons, the Mariners have fielded only two teams in the three team major league. This allowed the club to develop quickly and in the 2014 season, the Mariners fielded three teams in the Illawarra Senior Baseball League.

The Mariners originally played out of Fred Finch Park in Berkeley, Wollongong. However, on 24 July 2014, the Mariners started playing at their long-awaited home at the South Nowra Soccer Complex, which is an exclusive baseball facility.

The Mariners are also developing their Junior Sides, with the new Junior Season starting with Come and Try Days in September 2016 for children ages between 4 and 15, with Come and Try Junior Baseball and T-Ball sessions being held in Nowra, Sanctuary Point and Ulladulla. For a number of years the Mariners Juniors have trained and played on Friday evenings with the season running from October to March.

The Mariners also fielded their first ever Junior side in the Illawarra Junior Baseball League in 2013/14, with their U12's Little League finishing a respectable 3rd in their debut season.

References

External links
 Official Website

2005 establishments in Australia
Baseball teams established in 2005
Sports clubs established in 2005
Australian baseball clubs
Sports teams in Wollongong